Peltarion is a genus of crabs belonging to the family Trichopeltariidae. It is a monotypic genus, whose only species is Peltarion spinulosum.

The species of this genus are found in Southern America.

References

Crabs
Crustaceans described in 1843
Crustaceans of South America